Sutton-on-Hull railway station was a railway station that served the village of Sutton-on-Hull in the East Riding of Yorkshire, England. It was on the Hull and Hornsea Railway.

The station opened on 28 March 1864, and was originally named "Sutton", on 1 December 1874 the station became "Sutton-on-Hull". The station closed following the Beeching Report on 19 October 1964 and the station building was demolished; the station-master's house is still extant and is a private residence.

References

External links
 Sutton-on-Hull station on navigable 1947 O. S. map

Disused railway stations in Kingston upon Hull
Railway stations in Great Britain opened in 1864
Railway stations in Great Britain closed in 1964
Former North Eastern Railway (UK) stations
Beeching closures in England
Hull and Hornsea Railway